Augustus Bateman (3 August 1839 – 18 December 1922) was an English first-class cricketer active 1859–62 who played for Nottinghamshire and Cambridge University. He was born in West Leake and died in Mapperley.

References

1839 births
1922 deaths
English cricketers
Nottinghamshire cricketers
Cambridge University cricketers
People from Rushcliffe (district)
Cricketers from Nottinghamshire
People from Mapperley
Gentlemen of the North cricketers